The Classification Research Group (CRG) was a significant contributor to classification research and theory in the field of library and information science in the latter half of the 20th century. It was formed in England in 1952 and was active until 1968. Informal meetings continued until 1990. Among its members were Derek Austin, Eric Coates, Jason Farradane, Robert Fairthorne, Douglas Foskett, Barbara Kyle, Derek Langridge, Jack Mills, Pauline Atherton Cochrane, Bernard Palmer, Jack Wells, and Brian Campbell Vickery. The group formed important principles on faceted classification and also worked on the theory of integrative levels.

Publications 
 1955. The need for a faceted classification as the basis for all methods of information retrieval. Library Association Record,  57(7), 262-268.
 1958. Classification Research Group Bulletin No. 4. Journal of Documentation, 14( 3), 136-143.
 1959. Classification Research Group Bulletin No. 5. Journal of Documentation, 15(1), 39-57.
 1961. Classification Research Group Bulletin No. 6. Journal of Documentation, 17(3), 156-172.
 1962. Classification Research Group Bulletin No. 7. Journal of Documentation, 18( 2), 65-88.
 1964. Classification Research Group Bulletin No. 8. Journal of Documentation, 20(3), 146-169.
 1968. Classification Research Group Bulletin No. 9. Journal of Documentation, 24(4), 273-298.
 1969. Classification and information control: Papers representing the work of the Classification Research Group during 1960-1968. London: Library Association.

See also 
 Document classification
 Knowledge organization
 Subject (documents)

References

Further reading 
 Afolabi, M. (1985). A sociological study of the Classification Research Group. Library Science with a Slant to Documentation, 22(2), 77-85.
 Broughton, Vanda (2011). Brian Vickery and the Classification Research Group: the legacy of faceted classification. In Gilchrist, A. (Ed.) Proceedings of the Second National ISKO UK Conference 2011.
 Frohmann, Bernard P. (1983). An investigation of the semantic bases of some theoretical principles of classification proposed by Austin and the CRG. Cataloging and Classification Quarterly, 4(1), 11-27.

Library science organizations
Information science
Research groups